Yevgeny Petrov may refer to:
Evgeni Petrov (cyclist) (born 1978), Russian cyclist
Yevgeni Petrov (runner), Russian runner who participated in the 1912 Olympics
Yevgeni Petrov (sport shooter) (born 1938), Soviet sport shooter
Yevgeny Petrov (writer) (1902–1942), Soviet writer
Evgeny Petrov (sledge hockey) (born 1990), Russian sledge hockey player
Yevgeny Petrov (serial killer) (born 1975), Russian serial killer, rapist and pedophile